Beat the Boss is a business gameshow broadcast in the United Kingdom as part of the BBC's children-oriented programming, CBBC. It was presented by Cameron Johnson and originally Saira Khan. The format features two teams, one team of children named "The Bright Sparks", and one team of adults named "The Big Shots", creating a product that will appeal to the children's market. At the end of each episode, a panel of children vote for their favourite product and the team with the most votes wins the beat the boss trophy and a limousine ride home while the losers take the bus.

Series 1

Fruit Drink
Aired: Monday 22 May 2006
Filmed: 2005
Brief:
Bright Sparks: Joseph, Becky & James
Bright Sparks product: "Creative Juices"
Big Shots: Rachel, Mark & Jo
Big Shots product: "VIBE"
Winner: The Bright Sparks

Dog Backpack
Aired: Monday 29 May 2006
Filmed: 2005
Brief:
Bright Sparks: George, Nina & Sam
Bright Sparks product:
Big Shots: Andrea, Ali & Andy
Big Shots product:
Winner: The Big Shots

Practical Joke
Aired:
Filmed:
Brief:
Bright Sparks: Shawn, Holly & Callum
Bright Sparks product: "The FP3 Player"
Big Shots: Tom, Calypso & Alan
Big Shots product: "The Screaming Diary"
Winner: The Bright Sparks

Inflatable
Aired:
Filmed:
Brief:
Bright Sparks: Robert, Radha & Owen
Bright Sparks product:
Big Shots: Jonathan, Karen & Spencer
Big Shots product:
Winner: The Bright Sparks

Sleepover Experience
Aired:
Filmed:
Brief:
Bright Sparks: Lauren, Ben & Aimee
Bright Sparks product:
Big Shots: Narrinder, Tia & Tom
Big Shots product:
Winner: The Bright Sparks

Comic Relief does Beat the Boss
A special version of Beat the Boss was shown before Red Nose Day 2007. It involved The Bright Sparks and a celebrity team of The Big Shots composed of Joe Pasquale, Duncan Bannatyne and Chantelle Preston. The teams had to design a suit for Lenny Henry to wear on the night. Viewers were asked to phone in and vote for their favourite.
During Red Nose Day 2007, Saira Khan and the two teams were on the stage, and Saira Khan announced that the winners were "The Bright Sparks", Lenny Henry came from backstage wearing the designed suit.

Series 2

Swim
Aired:
Filmed:
Brief:
Bright Sparks: Robin, Oscar & Jess
Bright Sparks product:
Big Shots: Paul, Charlie & Jak
Big Shots product:
Winner: The Bright Sparks

Board Game
Aired:
Filmed:
Brief:
Bright Sparks: Harry, Charlotte & Daniel
Bright Sparks product:
Big Shots: Shauna, Syd & Denise
Big Shots product: "Beat the Boss"
Winner: The Bright Sparks

Ice
Aired:
Filmed:
Brief:
Bright Sparks: Bethany, Luke & Dani
Bright Sparks product:
Big Shots: Jonathan, Lydia & Doug
Big Shots product: "Rap Freeze"
Winner: The Big Shots

Bike
Aired:
Filmed:
Brief:
Bright Sparks: Joe, Lisa & Jimmy
Bright Sparks product: "MountRock"
Big Shots: Yana, Andy & Charlotte
Big Shots product: "BodyPAC"
Winner: The Bright Sparks

Hair
Aired:
Filmed:
Brief:
Bright Sparks: Craig, Alice & Dale
Bright Sparks product:
Big Shots: Sarah, Jason & Sian
Big Shots product:
Winner: The Bright Sparks

Football
Aired:
Filmed:
Brief:
Bright Sparks: Harry, Chloe & Janojan
Bright Sparks product:
Big Shots: Tom, Georgie & Stafford
Big Shots product:
Winner: The Big Shots

Chair
Aired:
Filmed:
Brief:
Bright Sparks: Aminah, David & Maxine
Bright Sparks product:
Big Shots: Ian, Tamara & Atif
Big Shots product:
Winner: The Big Shots

Cereal
Aired:
Filmed:
Brief:
Bright Sparks: Charmaine, James & Hannah
Bright Sparks product:
Big Shots: Theo, Mairi & Jimmy
Big Shots product:
Winner: The Big Shots

Pets
Aired:
Filmed:
Brief:
Bright Sparks: Rhiann, Sam & Abbie
Bright Sparks product:
Big Shots: Erfan, Rachel & Adam
Big Shots product:
Winner: The Bright Sparks

Outdoor Games
Aired:
Filmed:
Brief:
Bright Sparks: Hinay, Sianhael & Jake
Bright Sparks product:
Big Shots: Sumerah, Vincent & Gerry
Big Shots product:
Winner: The Bright Sparks

Series 3

Tent
Aired:
Filmed:
Brief: 
Bright Sparks: Anna, Samuel & Amy-Louise
Bright Sparks product: 
Big Shots: Jordan, Tricia & Amin Saleem
Big Shots product: 
Winner: The Bright Sparks

Rocket
Aired: 
Filmed: 
Brief:
Bright Sparks: Chae, Jack & Jessica
Bright Sparks product: "Sky High"
Big Shots: Wilfred, Collette & Imran
Big Shots product: "Lunar Lens"
Winner: The Bright Sparks

Bed
Aired:
Filmed:
Brief:
Bright Sparks: Charlotte, Charles & Niomi
Bright Sparks product: 
Big Shots: Robin, Liz & Matt
Big Shots product: 
Winner: The Big Shots

Hand Luggage
Aired:
Filmed:
Brief:
Bright Sparks: Zachary, Carolyn & Miron
Bright Sparks product:
Big Shots: Sue, Ranzie & Roisin
Big Shots product:
Winner: The Bright Sparks

Reptiles
Aired:
Filmed:
Brief: 
Bright Sparks: Callum, Anna & Alex
Bright Sparks product: 
Big Shots: Tracey, Alvin & Eddie
Big Shots product: 
Winner: The Bright Sparks

Cake
Aired: 
Filmed:
Brief: 
Bright Sparks: Isabel, Richard & Leah
Bright Sparks product: 
Big Shots: Alex, Laura & Will
Big Shots product: 
Winner: The Big Shots

Series 4 & Beat the Boss USA
Series 4 was partly filmed in America, with an American presenter (Cameron Johnson from Oprah's Big Give), American Big Shots, and one of the three Bright Sparks was also American. It was filmed during the Summer of 2008 and aired beginning January 2009.  The first five episodes are called "Beat the Boss USA".

Dog Outfit
Aired:
Filmed:
Brief:
Location: New York
Company:
Bright Sparks: Victoria, Khaleel & Violet
Bright Sparks product:
Big Shots: Susan, Andrew & Sunny
Big Shots product:
Winner: The Big Shots

Cheesecake
Aired:
Filmed:
Brief:
Location: Los Angeles
Company: The Cheesecake Factory
Bright Sparks: Laura, Harry & Sierra
Bright Sparks product:
Big Shots: David, Cheryl & Ryan
Big Shots product:
Winner: The Big Shots

Outdoor Craze
Aired: January 2009
Filmed: August 2008 in San Francisco, Santa Cruz Beach, and Emeryville, California.
Brief: "You'll need to whip the nation into a frenzy with this challenge. Your team has to create an outdoor craze to take America's backyards by storm. Your craze must have an element of skill and it must be easy to carry around."
Location: San Francisco
Company: Wham-O
Bright Sparks:  Rhys, Ruth & Eli
Bright Sparks product: "Pogo Ball"
Big Shots: Bob, Margaret & Ray
Big Shots product: "Hoop Flyers"
Winner: The Bright Sparks

All Purpose Sauce
Aired:
Filmed:
Brief:
Location: Pittsburgh
Company: Heinz
Bright Sparks: Rosie, Rory & Brana
Bright Sparks product:
Big Shots: Nathan, Kelley & Emmai
Big Shots product:
Winner: The Big Shots

Street Wear
Aired:
Filmed:
Brief:
Location: Los Angeles
Company:
Bright Sparks: Ali, Cherelle & Oliver
Bright Sparks product:
Big Shots: Debbie, Sean & Lucinda
Big Shots product:
Winner: The Big Shots

Karting
Aired:
Filmed:
Brief:
Bright Sparks: Jess, James & Sam
Bright Sparks product:
Big Shots: Khami, Stef & Katy
Big Shots product:
Winner: The Bright Sparks

Den
Aired:
Filmed:
Brief:
Bright Sparks: Shannon, Ned & Ella
Bright Sparks product:
Big Shots: Matt, Sally & James
Big Shots product:
Winner: The Big Shots

Beach Inflatable
Aired:
Filmed:
Brief:
Bright Sparks: Will, Charlie & Hakim
Bright Sparks product:
Big Shots: Jacky, James & Dee
Big Shots product:
Winner: The Big Shots

Luxury Cat Pad
Aired:
Filmed:
Brief:
Bright Sparks: Aliyah, Jay & Shanice
Bright Sparks product:
Big Shots: Ben, Jane & Amarron
Big Shots product:
Winner: The Bright Sparks

Wet Weather Gear
Aired:
Filmed:
Brief:
Bright Sparks: Mustafa, Cordelia & Robert
Bright Sparks product:
Big Shots: Rebecca, Umer & Claire
Big Shots product:
Winner: The Big Shots

Series 5

Cricket
Aired: 
Filmed:
Brief: 
Bright Sparks: Connor, Olivia & Asim
Bright Sparks product: 
Big Shots: Deidre, Richard & Mel
Big Shots product: 
Winner: The Bright Sparks

Bike
Aired: 
Filmed:
Brief: 
Bright Sparks: Bethan, Daniel & Monet
Bright Sparks product:
Big Shots: Edwin, Emma & Imran
Big Shots product:
Winner: The Big Shots

Fashion
Aired: 
Filmed:
Brief: 
Bright Sparks: Alex, Kimberley & Khalil
Bright Sparks product: 
Big Shots: Laura, John & Sandy
Big Shots product: 
Winner: The Big Shots

Recycling
Aired: 
Filmed:
Brief: 
Bright Sparks: Harry, J'nae & Riordan
Bright Sparks product: 
Big Shots: Nicola, Moneeb & Sarah
Big Shots product: 
Winner: The Bright Sparks

Crisps

Aired: 
Filmed:
Brief: 
Bright Sparks: Ruwa, Allan & Leah
Bright Sparks product: 
Big Shots: Obi, Clare & Neil
Big Shots product: 
Winner: The Big Shots

Other versions
In September 2008, an Irish version of the show in Irish language started on BBC Northern Ireland. Hosted by Céara Ní Choinn, it is titled Gaisce Gnó (Be the Business). In this version, the Big Shots appear to come more from the visual media world than from big business. The first challenge was to create a board game.

References

External links 
 

BBC children's television shows
BBC Television shows
2006 British television series debuts
2009 British television series endings
2000s British game shows
BBC television game shows
English-language television shows